Colan District (Spanish: Distrito de Colán)  is one of seven districts of the province Paita in Peru.

References

Colan Peru is a small fishing village on the Northern Coast of Peru. Colan is a safe, friendly village that enjoys a relaxed way of life. There are a large number of vacation beach homes owned by Peruvians and opened during the summer.. January - March. This is Colan's high season. 
Colan has a number of small hotels and miles of virgin white sand beaches. There are 360 days of sun per year and Colan is only 45 minutes West of Piura, making it an excellent vacation spot.